Pseudagrion draconis is a species of damselfly in the family Coenagrionidae. It is commonly known as the mountain sprite.

Distribution and status
This sprite is endemic to South Africa and Lesotho; It is found from the south-western and southern Cape through the montane parts of the Eastern Cape, eastern Free State, Lesotho and KwaZulu-Natal to southern Gauteng. The species currently has no known threats. Its population is locally abundant and apparently stable.

Habitat
Pseudagrion draconis is found at the vegetated edges of streams and rivers from October to March.

References

External links

 Pseudagrion draconis on African Dragonflies and Damselflies Online

Coenagrionidae
Odonata of Africa
Insects described in 1937